The mass media in Mauritania is undergoing a shift into a freer journalistic environment, while becoming increasingly open to private sector.

The laws governing media are the most liberal in the Sub-Saharan Africa region.  As of 2010, Reporters Without Borders ranked Mauritania 99 out of 178 in its worldwide index of press freedom.

A setback for press freedom occurred in 2009, when Hanevy Ould Dehah, editor of the website Taqadoumy, was imprisoned for several months, with an arbitrarily extended prison sentence, on the grounds of offending morals. Journalists may be banned in Mauritania for publishing work that undermines Islam.

After a coup in 2008, the new regime clamped down on some radio and television journalists, while other media enjoyed freedom of speech, notably "Le Calame" and "La Tribune". Poorly paid journalists often edit work on demand by politicians or business interests. Self-censoring and lack of sources for articles are other problems marring balanced reporting in Mauritania.

Print
Print media are enjoying a period of freedom under the current government, and freedom of speech is, for the most part, flourishing. The most popular print publications in Mauritania today are sensationalist newspapers called "peshmergas".

 Akhbar Nouakchott, daily, in Arabic
 Le Calame (Al-Qalam), weekly, in Arabic and French 
 Chaab, daily, in Arabic
 L'Eveil-Hebdo, weekly
 Horizons, daily, in French
 Journal Officiel, government journal of record 
 Al-Mourabit 
 Nouakchott Info, daily, in French
 Le Quotidien de Nouakchott 
 Rajoul Echaree

Television 

Mauritania's TV stations are state-owned. In 2010, however, the government passed legislation to open broadcasting to the private sector. Mauritania's public television station also has six regional stations that offer local programming.

 Television de Mauritanie (TVM), in Arabic and French

News agencies:
 Mauritanian News Agency (AMI), public agency
 Maurinews, privately owned

Radio

Mauritania's radio stations are state-owned. In 2010, however, the government passed legislation to open broadcasting to the private sector.

 Radio Mauritanie, in Arabic and French
 Radio France Internationale
 BBC World Service, FM 106.9 in Nouakchott  and 102.4 in Nouadhibou

Agence Indépendante d'information ALAKHBAR. Première agence d’information indépendante en mauritanien. Elle publie en Arabe et en Français

Telecommunications

Mauritel, which was privatized in 2001, maintains a monopoly over fixed-line service.

Mobile phone service is mostly restricted to urban areas, where 70 out of 100 people have mobile phones. Moroccan-owned Maroc Telecom operates in Mauritania, as well as Burkina Faso, Gabon and Mali.

See also

 
 Arab States Broadcasting Union
 Federation of Arab News Agencies (FANA)

References

Bibliography
  (Includes information about broadcast media)

External links
 
 . (News site)

 
Mauritania
Mauritania